Orthenches dictyarcha is a moth of the family Plutellidae first described by Edward Meyrick in 1927. It is endemic to New Zealand and has been observed at Arthur's Pass and at Hollyford Valley in Fiordland. It is one of the larger species in its genus and is similar in appearance to O. homerica. Its preferred habitat is beech forest and adults are on the wing in January.

Taxonomy
This species was first described by Edward Meyrick in 1927 and named Orthenches dictyarcha using a male specimen collected at Arthur's Pass at 3000 ft. in January by George Hudson. Hudson discussed and illustrated this species in his 1939 book A supplement to the butterflies and moths of New Zealand. The female holotype specimen is held at the Natural History Museum, London.

Description

Meyrick described this species as follows:

This species is regarded as one of the largest in the genus. It is very similar in appearance to O. homerica.

Distribution

This species is endemic to New Zealand and has been observed at Arthur's Pass. It has also been collected in Fiordland at Milford Road, above lower Hollyford Valley.

Habitat
This species frequents beech forest.

Behaviour
Adults of this species are on the wing in January.

References

Plutellidae
Moths of New Zealand
Moths described in 1927
Endemic fauna of New Zealand
Taxa named by Edward Meyrick
Endemic moths of New Zealand